Edward Livermore Burlingame (born in Boston on 30 May 1848, died in New York City on 15 November 1922) was an American writer and editor.

Biography
He entered Harvard, but left before graduation to accompany his father, Anson Burlingame, to China as his private secretary. He studied at the University of Heidelberg, Germany, in 1867-1869, taking the degree of Ph.D., and afterward studied at Berlin. He traveled extensively in Japan and China in 1866, and afterward in Europe.

He was on the editorial staff of the New York Tribune in 1871, and on that for the revision of the American Cyclopaedia in 1872-1876. He was a contributor to periodical literature, and associated in the preparation of several histories and other works. In 1879, he became connected editorially with the publishing house of Charles Scribner's Sons, New York.
In 1886, he was appointed founding editor-in-chief of Scribner's Magazine, where he served until his resignation in 1914.  After 1914, he was a general editorial adviser to Scribner's.

Works

He translated and edited Art, Life and Theories of Richard Wagner (New York, 1875).

Notes

References

1848 births
1922 deaths
19th-century American writers
American editors
Heidelberg University alumni
Harvard University alumni
Writers from New York City
American expatriates in Germany